Dichomeridinae is a subfamily of moths in the family Gelechiidae.

Distribution
Almost worldwide, except the Arctic and Antarctic regions.

Diversity
The subfamily formerly included three tribes, about 29 genera and about 900 species. However, a 2013 study moved the Chelariini to the subfamily Anacampsinae.

Taxonomy and systematics
Dichomeridini Hampson, 1918
Acanthophila
Acompsia
Anasphaltis
Arotria Meyrick, 1904
Atasthalistis Meyrick, 1886
Besciva Busck, 1914
Brachmia
Cathegesis Walsingham, 1910
Dichomeris
Eunebristis Meyrick, 1923
Harpagidia Ragonot, 1895
Helcystogramma 
Holaxyra Meyrick, 1913
Hylograptis Meyrick, 1910
Hyodectis
Myconita
Onebala Walker, 1864
Oxypteryx Rebel, 1911
Plocamosaris Meyrick, 1912
Rhadinophylla Turner, 1919
Sclerocopa Meyrick, 1937
Scodes 
Streniastis
Symbolistis
Syndesmica (not Gelechiidae?)

Formerly placed here
Anaptilora (now in Autostichidae)
Capidentalia (=Bagdadia)

References

  2006: Subfamily Dichomeridinae (Lepidoptera, Gelechiidae): Phylogeny, classification, and position in the system of gelechiid moths. Entomologicheskoe Obozrenie, 85 (2): 375–384. [In Russian, English translation in Entomological review, 86 (4): 449–456. (2006)]
 , 1998: A systematic study on the genus Dendrophilia Ponomarenko, 1993 from China (Lepidoptera: Gelechiidae). Shilap Revista de Lepidopterologia 26 (102): 101–111.
 , 2011: New and little known species of Lepidoptera of southwestern Africa. Esperiana Buchreihe zur Entomologie Memoir 6: 146–261.
 , 2008: Functional morphology of the male genitalia in Gelechiidae (Lepidoptera) and its signifi cance for phylogenetic analysis. Nota Lepidopterologica 31 (2): 179–198. Full Article: .
 , 2012: Four new species of the tribe Chelariini (Lepidoptera, Gelechiidae) from Japan. Transactions of the Lepidopterological Society of Japan 63 (2): 79–86. Abstract and full article: .
  1998: New taxonomic data on Dichomeridinae (Lepidoptera: Gelechiidae) from the Russian Far East. Far Eastern Entomologist 67: 1–17. Full article: .
  2008: Functional morphology of the male genitalia in Gelechiidae (Lepidoptera) and its signifi cance for phylogenetic analysis. Nota Lepidopterologica 31 (2): 179–198. Full Article: .

External links

 
Gelechiidae
Moth subfamilies